60S ribosomal protein L35a is a protein that in humans is encoded by the RPL35A gene.

Ribosomes, the organelles that catalyze protein synthesis, consist of a small 40S subunit and a large 60S subunit. Together these subunits are composed of 4 RNA species and approximately 80 structurally distinct proteins. This gene encodes a ribosomal protein that is a component of the 60S subunit. The protein belongs to the L35AE family of ribosomal proteins. It is located in the cytoplasm. The rat protein has been shown to bind to both initiator and elongator tRNAs, and thus, it is located at the P site, or P and A sites, of the ribosome. Although this gene was originally mapped to chromosome 18, it has been established that it is located at 3q29-qter. Transcript variants utilizing alternative transcription initiation sites and alternative polyA signals exist. As is typical for genes encoding ribosomal proteins, there are multiple processed pseudogenes of this gene dispersed through the genome.

References

Further reading

External links
  GeneReviews/NCBI/NIH/UW entry on Diamond-Blackfan Anemia

Ribosomal proteins